Palazzo Zuccari is a 16th-century palace in Florence built by Federico Zuccari.

Zuccari
Mannerist architecture in Italy